La Antigua may refer to:

 La Antigua Guatemala
 La Antigua, Veracruz, Mexico
La Antigua, León, Spain

See also
Antigua (disambiguation)